N1 League, (known until 2016 as the Nevis Premier Division) is the top tier of association football in Nevis. The league was created in 2004 and organized by the St. Kitts and Nevis Football Association.

Clubs for the 2013/14 season
Allstars
Bath United
Bronx United
Combined Schools
Hardtimes
Highlights FC
Stoney Grove Strikers
Villa International United

Previous winners
2004 : Bath United
2004/05 : Fitness Pioneers
2005/06 : Harris United
2006/07 : Stoney Grove Strikers
2007/08 : Horsford Highlights
2008/09 : Horsford Highlights
2009/10 : Stoney Grove Strikers
2010/11 : abandoned
2011/12 : not held
2012/13 : not held
2013/14 : Horsford Highlights
2014/15 : not held
2015/16 : not held
2016/17 : Horsford Highlights
2017/18 : abandoned

Performance by club

References
Saint Kitts and Nevis - List of Champions, RSSSF.com

Football leagues in Saint Kitts and Nevis
Top level football leagues in the Caribbean
2004 establishments in Saint Kitts and Nevis
Sports leagues established in 2004